Vincent "Vinci" Hösch (born 16 February 1957 in Munich, West Germany) is a German sailor in the Laser, Finn, Tempest, Star, Soling & Dragon classes.

He won the 1981 Star World Championships crewing for Alexander Hagen.

References

German male sailors (sport)
Dragon class sailors
Laser class sailors
Soling class sailors
Star class sailors
Tempest class sailors
H-boat class sailors
Star class world champions
World champions in sailing for Germany
1957 births
Living people